Lauren Walsh is an American film actress best known for her roles in films such as 18 Year Old Virgin and Meet the Spartans. Her debut came in a Jason J. Gray short entitled At Day's End. In 2008-2009 she starred in Aaron James Sorensen movie Campus Radio.

Filmography

Film

Television

References

External links

Year of birth missing (living people)
Living people
American film actresses
21st-century American women